In jewelry, a collar is an ornament for the neck.

Collar is an older word for necklace, and is usually reserved today for a necklace that lies flat to the body rather than hanging freely and rests directly above the collar bone.

In contemporary fine jewelry, collar necklaces are 14 inches in chain length and look similar to a collar on a shirt. In street fashion, collars are more commonly referred to as dog collars. Dog collars are associated with the punk scene and the BDSM scene.

Specifically, collar may refer to:

 One of the insignia of an Order of Knighthood.See:Collar (Order of Knighthood)
A wide choker popular in the Edwardian period (also called a dog collar); the style was introduced by Princess Alexandra of Denmark (later, queen consort of the UK) who wore it to hide a scar on her neck.
The various livery collars or chains of office  worn by officers of state in England and the United Kingdom.
Any massive necklace of the sixteenth century or earlier.

References

External links
Portrait of Queen Alexandra in a diamond collar

Necklaces